Göran Karlsson (born 21 September 1937) is a Swedish former professional racing cyclist. He rode in the 1960 Tour de France.

References

External links
 

1937 births
Living people
Swedish male cyclists
Place of birth missing (living people)